Mirza Hosein Khan Moshir od-Dowleh Sepahsalar or simply Mirza Hosein Sepahsalar (1828–1881) was the Grand Vizier (prime minister) of Iran (Persia) during the Qajar dynasty under King Naser al-Din Shah Qajar between 1871 and 1873.

After a successful career in the Iranian foreign service, serving in Tiflis, Mirza Hosein Khan was made ambassador to Istanbul during the great Ottoman reform period after 1856. He seems also to have been influenced by at least two reformist thinkers: Fatali Akhundov, whom he got to know well in Tiflis, and Mirza Malkam Khan, whom he met in Istanbul.

On becoming Grand vizier, Mirza Hosein persuaded the Shah to grant a concession for railroad construction—the Reuter concession—and other commercial development projects to Baron de Reuter. Opposition from bureaucratic factions and clerical leaders, however, forced the Shah to dismiss his Grand Vizier and cancel the concession.

See also 
List of prime ministers of Iran
Prime Minister of Iran
Sepahsalar Mosque

References
 The Cambridge History of Iran 7; Peter Avery; Cambridge University Press, 1991
 The History of Iran (The Greenwood Histories of the Modern Nations); Elton L. Daniel; 2000

1828 births
1881 deaths
Prime Ministers of Iran
19th-century Iranian politicians
Ambassadors of Iran to the Ottoman Empire
Foreign ministers of Iran
People of Qajar Iran